Regelia velutina, the Barrens regelia, is a species of flowering plant in the myrtle family Myrtaceae. It is endemic to the south-west of Western Australia. It is a large shrub with greyish green, velvety leaves and large clusters of brilliant red to orange flowers on the ends of its branches in spring and summer.

Description

The flowers are reddish-orange, sometimes yellow, and arranged in almost spherical heads on the ends of branches which continue to grow after flowering. There are 5 sepals, 5 petals and 5 bundles of stamens in each flower. Flowering occurs from September to November, sometimes to February and is followed by fruit which are woody capsules.

Taxonomy and naming
The species was first formally described by Russian botanist, Nikolai Turczaninow in 1852 who named it Beaufortia velutina.  In 1964, the Australian botanist Charles Austin Gardner transferred it to the genus Regelia. The specific epithet is derived from the New Latin velutinus, meaning "velvety".

Distribution and habitat
Regelia velutina grows in sandy soil in rocky areas in the Avon Wheatbelt and Esperance Plains biogeographic regions.

It is listed as "not threatened" by the Government of Western Australia Department of Parks and Wildlife.

Use in horticulture
Although it has attractive foliage and flowers, R. velutina is not common in cultivation. It does not grow well in areas of high summer rainfall and humidity. In drier climates it prefers well drained soils. It is easy to propagate from seed but the leaves may rot if mist propagation systems are used. Its commercial potential for export as a Christmas flower has been assessed.

References

External links

Regelia velutina occurrence data from Australasian Virtual Herbarium

velutina
Myrtales of Australia
Endemic flora of Western Australia
Plants described in 1964